Glen Richard Milliner (born 14 April 1948) is an Australian compositor, businessman and politician who was a Labor member of the Legislative Assembly of Queensland for the electoral district of Everton from 1977 to 1992, and then for the new electoral district of Ferny Grove from 1992 to 1998. Under the Goss Ministry, he served in the Cabinet variously as Minister for Justice, Minister for Consumer Affairs (until 18 October 1993), Minister for Corrective Services (until 18 October 1993), and Minister for Administrative Services (from 18 October 1993).

Background 
He is the son of trade union activist and Labor Senator from Queensland, Bert Milliner. Like his father, he is a qualified typesetter and compositor; he also owns a news agency. He is married and has three children.

Elected office 
He was first elected to the Assembly for the seat of Everton in the 1977 election, unseating Liberal incumbent Brian Lindsay. In 1992 he switched to the newly created seat of Ferny Grove where he remained till his retirement from politics.

He did not run for re-election in 1998, and was succeeded by fellow Labor member Geoff Wilson.

References 

1948 births
Living people
Australian media executives
Members of the Queensland Legislative Assembly
Typesetters